Zigzag Bluff is a rock bluff at the foot of Herbert Range, overlooking Ross Ice Shelf about 5 miles (8 km) west of the terminus of Axel Heiberg Glacier. Probably first seen by Roald Amundsen in 1911, the bluff was roughly mapped by the Byrd Antarctic Expedition, 1928–30. So named by the Southern Party of the New Zealand Geological Survey Antarctic Expedition (NZGSAE), 1961–62, because of the peculiar folding of the marble on the bluff.

Cliffs of the Ross Dependency
Amundsen Coast